Hugh Edward Wise (March 9, 1906 – July 21, 1987) was an American professional baseball catcher, manager and scout.  A native of Campbellsville, Kentucky, Wise attended Purdue University, where he played college baseball for the Boilermakers from 1926 to 1927.  His son Casey Wise played Major League Baseball, and another son, Hugh Jr., played in the minor leagues.

Hugh Sr.'s major league career occurred over a two-day period, September 26–27, 1930, for the Detroit Tigers. He batted six times, with two hits, both singles. He handled 11 total chances in the field without an error. Wise played for 13 seasons in the minor leagues (1930–1941; 1946), and managed in the mid-to-lower minor leagues during the late 1930s and 1940s, largely in the Class D KITTY League. He then turned to scouting for the Boston Braves/Milwaukee Braves, New York Yankees and Chicago White Sox. His duties at one time included scouting the Caribbean and Latin America and designing baseball fields.

He died in Plantation, Florida, at age 81.

References

External links

1906 births
1987 deaths
Asheville Tourists players
Baseball players from Kentucky
Beaumont Exporters players
Boston Braves scouts
Chicago White Sox scouts
Dallas Steers players
Detroit Tigers players
Galveston Buccaneers players
Houston Buffaloes players
Jersey City Skeeters players
Little Rock Travelers players
Longview Cannibals players
Major League Baseball catchers
Memphis Chickasaws players
Milwaukee Braves scouts
Nashville Vols players
New York Yankees scouts
Owensboro Oilers players
Owensboro Pirates players
Pawtucket Slaters players
People from Campbellsville, Kentucky
Portageville Pirates players
Purdue Boilermakers baseball players
Toledo Mud Hens players
Wichita Falls Spudders players